Ruoska (in Finnish "whip") is a Finnish metal band from the Juva municipality.

Biography

The beginnings, Kuori and Riisu (2002−2003) 
Ruoska was formed in 2002 with some of the same members from the comedy rock band Natsipaska. They released their debut album Kuori the same year.

Radium and Amortem (2004−2007) 
In 2005, Radium was released. 

Ruoska recorded Amortem in 2006.  The singles "Mies yli Laidan" and "Alasin" were turned into music videos.  The album itself debuted at sixth place in Finnish radio charts for almost 10 weeks.

Rabies, the hiatus and the present (2008−present) 
Ruoska's fifth album Rabies was released on April 9, 2008.

Members

Current members
 Patrik Mennander − lead vocals
 Anssi Auvinen − guitar, backing vocals
 Mika Kamppi − bass, backing vocals
 Teemu Karppinen − drums

Former members
 Sami Karppinen - drums
 Kai Ahvenranta − guitar, backing vocals
 Timo Laatikainen − drums, percussions
Note: Kai Ahvenranta still does some studio work with the band.

Discography

Albums
 Kuori (2002)
 Riisu (2003)
 Radium (2005)
 Amortem (2006)
 Rabies (2008)

Singles
 Aurinko ei Nouse (2002)
 Darmstadt (2003)
 Veriura (2004, released digitally)
 Tuonen Viemää (2005)
 Mies yli Laidan (2006)
 Pure minua (2006)
 Alasin (2006)
 Pirunkieli (2007, released digitally)
 Helvettiin Jäätynyt (2008)
 Lihaa Vasten Lihaa (2008, released digitally)
 Ei Koskaan (2008, released digitally)
 Runno (2021)
 Kade (2022)
 Silti Syntinen (2022)

Music videos
 "Kiroan" (2002)
 "Epilogi" (2002)
 "Tuonen Viemää" (2005)
 "Mies yli Laidan" (2006)
 "Alasin" (2006)
 "Ei Koskaan" (2008)

External links
Official website 

Finnish heavy metal musical groups
Musical groups established in 2002
Musical quartets
2002 establishments in Finland
Industrial metal musical groups